Ítalo Ferreira (born May 6, 1994) is a Brazilian professional surfer hailing from a small community of Baía Formosa, in Rio Grande do Norte on the northeastern coast of Brazil. Ferreira is one of the most explosive surfers in the world and is known for his high-energy approach and willingness to entertain at all costs. He learned to surf on a three-foot-long lid of a coolbox his father used to transport fish to sell to restaurants in Baia Formosa. He quickly progressed to a real board and at 12 years of age, his talent was noticed and then nurtured by fellow surfer Jadson Andre and the legendary Brazilian surf coach, Luiz 'Pinga' Campos, who was then marketing director of one of the world's leading surf brands. Soon after, Ítalo won two rounds of the Junior World Championship in 2011 (finishing runner-up in the category overall), won the Brazilian Championship and in 2014, he finally qualified for the World Championship Tour – the elite of world surfing.

Ferreira first gained notoriety on the Championship Tour during his 2015 rookie season with a spellbinding aerial attack, a strong backhand and a vicious rail game. During his breakout year, he made the Semifinals in Rio and the Quarterfinals in Fiji, Tahiti, and France before making his first CT Final in Portugal. Italo ran away with the Rookie of the Year award after finishing his remarkable year 7th in the rankings. From that time on, many considered him a serious Title threat, including his hero Mick Fanning. However, his stellar rookie season was followed by a few inconsistent seasons. He had bright spots in 2016 with Semifinal appearances at Bells and Margaret River but was stopped in Round Five seven times, finishing the year 15th in the rankings.  He looked on track to rebound in 2017 after a strong fifth-place finish at Snapper, but two days after the event, he tore ligaments in his ankle, and he missed the next three stops. Eventually, finishing 22nd in the rankings. He bounced back almost immediately in 2018, with event wins at Bells, Keramas, and Supertubos, finishing the season 4th in the rankings. In 2019, Ítalo started by winning the first tour stop of the year on the Australian Gold Coast. Later, he also won the inaugural Red Bull Airborne event. He would continue the season with a victory at MEO Pro Portugal and final runner-up finishes at the J-Bay Open and Quicksilver Pro France. The final event of the year was at the Pipe Masters, where Ítalo contested the title with his compatriot Gabriel Medina in the finals, eventually winning the event and being crowned world champion. On July, 27th, 2021, Italo Ferreira won the first men's Olympic surfing gold medal in the 2020 Tokyo Summer Olympics.

Career

Victories

WSL World Championship Tour

References

External links
 

Brazilian surfers
1994 births
Living people
World Surf League surfers
Olympic surfers of Brazil
Surfers at the 2020 Summer Olympics
Olympic gold medalists for Brazil
Medalists at the 2020 Summer Olympics
Olympic medalists in surfing